Hưng Nguyên is a rural district of Nghệ An province in the North Central Coast region of Vietnam. As of 2003 the district had a population of 120,720. The district covers an area of 162 km². The district capital lies at Hưng Nguyên.

Administrative districts 
Hung Nguyen district has 18 commune-level administrative units, including Hung Nguyen town (district capital) and 17 communes: Châu Nhân, Hưng Đạo, Hưng Lĩnh, Hưng Lợi, Hưng Mỹ, Hưng Nghĩa, Hưng Phúc, Hưng Tân, Hưng Tây, Hưng Thành, Hưng Thịnh, Hưng Thông, Hưng Trung, Hưng Yên Bắc, Hưng Yên Nam, Long Xá, Xuân Lam.

References

Districts of Nghệ An province